Be Natural: The Untold Story of Alice Guy-Blaché is a 2018 documentary about the first female filmmaker Alice Guy-Blaché, directed by Pamela B. Green. It was screened out of competition at the 2018 Cannes Film Festival in the Cannes Classics category. It was nominated for the festival's L'Œil d'or documentary prize. Be Natural went on to screen at Telluride, Deauville American Film Festival, New York Film Festival, and London BFI Film Festival.

Synopsis 
Narrated by Jodie Foster, Be Natural: The Untold Story of Alice Guy-Blaché is a two-hour feature documentary investigating the full scope of the life and work of cinema's first female director, screenwriter, producer, and studio owner Alice Guy-Blaché.

Production 
The project was launched with a successful Kickstarter campaign, which prompted other crowdfunding opportunities.

Critical response 
Reviews for the version of the film screened at Cannes were generally positive, with Deadlines Pete Hammond claiming it to be perhaps "The Best (And Least-Seen) Film in Cannes." Overall, critics positively reviewed the film. On review aggregator Rotten Tomatoes, the film holds  approval rating based on  reviews. The site's critical consensus reads, "Be Natural: The Untold Story of Alice Guy-Blaché aims an overdue spotlight on a cinematic innovator's career, with the added benefit of absorbing historical context." Reviewing for The Hollywood Reporter, Leslie Felperin considered that Be Natural "represents a timely contribution to the international conversation about the challenges facing women filmmakers while also boosting the reputation of someone who really should be better known by now as a role model. As a teaching and consciousness-raising tool, it will be an indispensable resource." A. O. Scott for The New York Times wrote, "Be Natural is inspiring because it is also appalling."

In a less positive review, Jay Weissberg wrote in Variety: "there's that title, The Untold Story, which ignores a number of earlier documentaries not to mention the significant amount of scholarship on pioneering filmmaker Alice Guy-Blaché. ... These are what can be called inconvenient truths, for Pamela B. Green, director of Be Natural, is on a mission to discover why—supposedly—no one has ever heard of Alice Guy-Blaché."

Be Natural premiered in the UK on January 17, 2020. Peter Bradshaw of The Guardian gave the film a 4 out of 5 star rating, calling it a "fascinating documentary." He also picked Be Natural as one of his 10 best documentaries of 2020. Gaby Wood of The Telegraph gave a positive review, calling it "gripping and poetic." Danny Leigh of The Financial Times also gave the film 4 out of 5 stars, stating: "With timing both flawless and bleak, few films arrive feeling so vital as Be Natural: The Untold Story of Alice Guy-Blaché." In December, the film was named one of the 50 Best Films of 2020 in the UK by The Guardian. The Guardian chief film critic Peter Bradshaw picked the film as one of his 10 favorite documentaries of 2020.

Be Natural premiered in France on June 22, 2020. Véronique Cauhapé of Le Monde gave the film 4 out of 5 stars.

Awards and nominations

References

External links

 
 
 

2018 films
American documentary films
2010s English-language films
2010s American films